Liguo is a rural town in Ledong Li Autonomous County, Hainan, People's Republic of China.

Administrative divisions
It include 15 villages and 1 community:

 Liguo Community
 Qinbiao Village
 Fofeng Village
 Guan Village
 Hekou Village
 Baosui Village
 Xinlian Village
 Xinmin Village
 Baoxin Village
 Hongwu Village
 Wenqie Village
 Baogao Village
Maopo Village
 Qiugang Village
 Yangshang Village
 Wanglou Village

Gallery

References

External links
 

Ledong Li Autonomous County